Arroz poblano or Mexican green rice a Mexican dish made with rice, in which its green color comes from a chile poblano liquid preparation.

The green liquid is made by blending roasted chile poblano with onion, cilantro, garlic and some water. White rice is fried in oil, then the liquid is added, as well as yellow corn grains, small strips of chile poblano and salt. The rice is simmered until tender.

References
 Gironella De'angeli, Alicia (2006). Larousse de la cocina mexicana. 

Mexican rice dishes